Ethylene-vinyl acetate (EVA), also known as poly (ethylene-vinyl acetate) (PEVA), is a copolymer of ethylene and vinyl acetate. The weight percent of vinyl acetate usually varies from 10 to 40%, with the remainder being ethylene. There are three different types of EVA copolymer, which differ in the vinyl acetate (VA) content and the way the materials are used.

The EVA copolymer which is based on a low proportion of VA (approximately up to 4%) may be referred to as vinyl acetate modified polyethylene. It is a copolymer and is processed as a thermoplastic material – just like low-density polyethylene. It has some of the properties of a low-density polyethylene but increased gloss (useful for film), softness and flexibility. The material is generally considered non-toxic.

The EVA copolymer, which is based on a medium proportion of VA (approximately 4 to 30%), is referred to as thermoplastic ethylene-vinyl acetate copolymer and is a thermoplastic elastomer material. It is not vulcanized but has some of the properties of a rubber or of plasticized polyvinyl chloride particularly at the higher end of the range. Both filled and unfilled EVA materials have good low temperature properties and are tough. The materials with approximately 11% VA are used as hot-melt adhesives.

The EVA copolymer which is based on a high proportion of VA (greater than 60%) is referred to as ethylene-vinyl acetate rubber.

EVA is an elastomeric polymer that produces materials which are "rubber-like" in softness and flexibility.  The material has good clarity and gloss, low-temperature toughness, stress-crack resistance, hot-melt adhesive waterproof properties, and resistance to UV radiation. EVA has a distinctive vinegar-like odor and is competitive with rubber and vinyl polymer products in many electrical applications.

Production

EVA is made by mixing ethylene and vinyl acetate in a processor, which creates an unrefined mass of EVA. It is fed through rollers that flatten it into sheets, which are then put into a pressure oven.

Applications

Hot-melt adhesives (such as hot glue sticks) and top-of-the-line soccer cleats are usually made from EVA, generally with additives like wax and resin. EVA is also used as a clinginess-enhancing additive in plastic wraps. Craft-foam sheets are made of EVA and are popularly used for children's foam stickers.

EVA is also used in biomedical engineering applications as a drug-delivery device. The polymer is dissolved in an organic solvent (such as dichloromethane). Powdered drug and filler (typically an inert sugar) are added to the liquid solution and rapidly mixed to obtain a homogeneous mixture. The drug-filler-polymer mixture is then cast into a mold at −80 °C and freeze-dried until solid. These devices are used in drug delivery research to slowly release a compound. The polymer does not biodegrade within the body, but is quite inert and causes little or no reaction following implantation.

EVA is one of the materials popularly known as expanded rubber or foam rubber. EVA foam is used as padding in equipment for various sports such as ski boots, bicycle saddles, hockey pads, boxing and mixed-martial-arts gloves and helmets, wakeboard boots, waterski boots, fishing rods, and fishing-reel handles. It is typically used as a shock absorber in sports shoes, for example. (Some manufacturers of running shoes, such as Nike, market EVA-based compression-moulded foam used in the manufacture of running shoes as "Phylon".)
It is used for the manufacture of floats for commercial fishing gear such as purse seine (seine fishing) and gillnets. In addition, because of its buoyancy, EVA has made its way into non-traditional products such as floating eyewear.  It is also used in the photovoltaics industry as an encapsulation material for crystalline silicon solar cells in the manufacture of photovoltaic modules. EVA slippers and sandals are popular, being lightweight, easy to form, odourless, glossy, and cheaper compared to natural rubber.  In fishing rods, EVA is used to construct handles on the rod-butt end. EVA can be used as a substitute for cork in many applications.

EVA copolymers are adhesives used in packaging, textile, bookbinding for bonding plastic films, metal surfaces, coated paper, and as redispersible powders in plasters and cement renders.

In recent years, EVA foam has seen popular use in cosplay communities, largely in part due to its ease to work with, durability, and comfort in comparison to traditional plastic-based costumes. 

Flower-making foam is a thin sheet made of EVA, which is flexible, and is used by artists and craft makers to make artificial flowers. These foams are presented as raw sheets and they can be cut into the desired petal shape and then can be formed by ironing to assemble artificial flowers by putting these petals together.

EVA is also used in coatings formulation of good-quality interior water-borne paints at 53% primary dispersant.

Hydrolysis of EVA gives ethylene vinyl alcohol (EVOH) copolymer (and acetic acid).

Other uses
EVA is used in orthotics, surfboard and skimboard traction pads, car mats, and for the manufacturing of some artificial flowers. It is used as a cold flow improver for diesel fuel and as a separator in HEPA filters.  EVA can easily be cut from sheets and molded to shape. It is also used to make thermoplastic mouthguards that soften in boiling water for a user-specific fit. It is also used for conditioning and waterproofing fabrics and leather.
EVA finds application in the making of nicotine transdermal patches, since the copolymer binds well with other agents to form gel-like substances.
EVA is also sometimes used as a material for some plastic model kit parts.

Safety and environmental considerations
Polyethylene vinyl acetate has recently become a popular alternative to polyvinyl chloride because it does not contain chlorine. As of 2014, EVA has not been found to be carcinogenic by the NTP, ACGIH, IARC, or OSHA, and has no known adverse effect on human health. Like many plastics, it is difficult to biodegrade. One study suggested it may have adverse effects on living organisms, but its effect on humans has not been determined.

See also
 Polyethylene
 Polyvinyl acetate
 Polyvinyl ester
 Vinyl polymer

References

External links

 List of EVA tradenames (2007; last update 2008; last archived 2022)
 

Acetate esters
Commodity chemicals
Copolymers
Elastomers
Plastics
Thermoplastics
Vinyl polymers